Summer Fruits (and Unrest) is an album led by composer, multi-instrumentalist and band leader Django Bates which was recorded in 1993 and released on the JMT label.

Reception

AllMusic awarded the album 3½ stars stating "hot full of breezy humor -- while also falling prey to the needless clutter so popular in fusion bands and jazz schools -- Summer Fruits will no doubt please fans who like their swing embedded in left field, yet logical dress".

Track listing
All compositions by Django Bates
 "Tight Rope" – 1:17
 "Armchair March" – 7:01 	
 "Food for Plankton (In Detail)" – 5:03 	
 "Säd Afrika" – 6:08 	
 "Three Architects Called Gabrielle: Just What I Expected" – 6:14 	
 "Queen of Puddings" – 8:19 	
 "Hyphen" – 5:32 	
 "Nights at the Circus" – 4:19 	
 "Discovering Metal" – 3:50 	
 "Little Petherick" – 6:30 	
 "March Hare Dance" – 3:02

Personnel
Django Bates – piano, keyboards, peck horn
Eddie Parker – flute, bass flute
Sarah Homer – clarinet, bass clarinet
Iain Ballamy, Steve Buckley – soprano saxophone, alto saxophone
Mark Lockheart, Barak Schmool – tenor saxophone
Julian Argüelles – baritone saxophone
Sid Gauld – high trumpet
Chris Batchelor – soloing trumpet
David Laurence – French horn
Roland Bates – trombone
Richard Henry – bass trombone
Sarah Waterhouse – tuba
Steve Watts – acoustic bass
Mike Mondesir – electric bass
Stuart Hall – electric guitar, violin, lap steel, banjo
Martin France – drums
Thebe Lipare – percussion

References 

1993 albums
Django Bates albums
JMT Records albums
Winter & Winter Records albums